The 88th Infantry Division was an infantry division of the United States Army that saw service in both World War I and World War II. It was one of the first of the Organized Reserve divisions to be called into federal service, created nearly "from scratch" after the implementation of the draft in 1940. Previous divisions were composed of either Regular Army or National Guard personnel. Much of the experience in reactivating it was used in the subsequent expansion of the U.S. Army.

By the end of World War II the 88th Infantry fought its way to the northernmost extreme of Italy. In early May 1945 troops of its 349th Infantry Regiment joined the 103d Infantry Division of the VI Corps of the U.S. Seventh Army, part of the 6th Army Group, which had raced south through Bavaria into Innsbruck, Austria, in Vipiteno in the Italian Alps.

World War I
Activated: 5 August 1917, Camp Dodge, Iowa
Overseas: 7 September 1918
Major operations: Did not participate as a division
Casualties: Total-78 (KIA-12; WIA-66)
Commanders:
 Maj. Gen. Edward H. Plummer (25 August 1917)
 Brig. Gen. Robert N. Getty (27 November 1917)
 Maj. Gen. Edward H. Plummer (19 February 1918)
 Brig. Gen. Robert N. Getty (15 March 1918)
 Brig. Gen. William D. Beach (24 May 1918)
 Maj. Gen. William Weigel (10 September 1918)
Inactivated: 10 June 1919, Camp Dodge, Iowa

Composition
Initially, personnel for the division were furnished by Selective Service men from Illinois, Iowa, Minnesota, and North Dakota. The 88th Division, like many National Army divisions, suffered heavily from transfers to Regular Army and National Guard units preparing to go overseas, delaying its combat readiness. In October and November 1917, men were transferred to the 34th and 87th Divisions. In February 1918, 12,000 men arrived from Iowa and Minnesota to bring the division to full strength, but, subsequently, about 16,000 men were transferred to the 30th, 33rd, 35th, 82nd, and 90th Divisions. In May and June 1918, 10,000 Selective Service men, mostly from Missouri, Nebraska, and South Dakota, joined the division.

The division was composed of the following units:

 Headquarters, 88th Division
 175th Infantry Brigade
 349th Infantry Regiment
 350th Infantry Regiment
 338th Machine Gun Battalion
 176th Infantry Brigade
 351st Infantry Regiment
 352nd Infantry Regiment
 339th Machine Gun Battalion
 163rd Field Artillery Brigade
 337th Field Artillery Regiment (155 mm)
 338th Field Artillery Regiment (75 mm)
 339th Field Artillery Regiment (155 mm)
 313th Trench Mortar Battery
 Headquarters Troop, 88th Division
 337th Machine Gun Battalion
 338th Engineer Regiment
 313th Field Signal Battalion
 313th Train Headquarters and Military Police
 313th Ammunition Train
 313th Supply Train
 313th Engineer Train
 313th Sanitary Train 
 349th, 350th, 351st, and 352nd Ambulance Companies and Field Hospitals

Interwar period

The division was reconstituted in the Organized Reserve on 24 June 1921 and assigned to the states of Minnesota, Iowa, and North Dakota. The headquarters was organized on 2 September 1921.

World War II
Ordered into active military service: 15 July 1942, Camp Gruber, Oklahoma
Overseas: 6 December 1943
Distinguished Unit Citations: 3
Campaigns: Rome-Arno, North Apennines, Po Valley
Days of combat: 344
Awards: Medal of Honor-3 ; Distinguished Service Cross (United States)-40 ; Distinguished Service Medal (United States)-2 ; Silver Star-522; Legion of Merit-66; Soldier's Medal-19 ; Bronze Star Medal-3,784.
Unit citations: Third Battalion, 351st Infantry Regiment (action vicinity Laiatico; 9–13 July 1944). Second Battalion, 350th Infantry Regiment (action on Mt. Battaglia, 27 Sept – 3 Oct 1944). Second Battalion, 351st Infantry Regiment (action vicinity Mt. Cappello, 27 Sept – 1 Oct 1944).
Commanders:
 Maj. Gen. John E. Sloan (July 1942 – September 1944)
 Maj. Gen. Paul W. Kendall (September 1944 – July 1945)
 Brig. Gen. James C. Fry (July–November 1945)
 Maj. Gen. Bryant Moore (November 1945 to inactivation)
Inactivated: 24 October 1947 in Italy

Combat chronicle
First Entered combat: Advance party on night of 3–4 January 1944 in support of Monte Cassino attacks.
First Organization Committed to Line: 2nd Battalion, 351st Infantry Regiment plus attachments
First combat fatality: 3 January 1944
Began post war POW Command: 7 June 1945. Responsible for guarding and later repatriating 324,462 German POWs.

The 88th Infantry Division was one of the first all-draftee divisions of the United States Army to enter the war. Ordered into active military service at Camp Gruber, Oklahoma, the division, commanded by Major General John E. Sloan, arrived at Casablanca, French Morocco on 15 December 1943, and moved to Magenta, Algeria, on 28 December for intensive training. Destined to spend the war fighting on the Italian Front, the 88th Division arrived at Naples, Italy on 6 February 1944, and concentrated around Piedimonte d'Alife for combat training. An advance element went into the line before Monte Cassino on 27 February, and the entire division relieved the battered British 46th Infantry Division along the Garigliano River in the Minturno area on 5 March. A period of defensive patrols and training followed. The 88th formed part of Major General Geoffrey Keyes's II Corps, part of the U.S. Fifth Army, under Lieutenant General Mark W. Clark.

After being inspected by the Fifth Army commander on 5 May, the 88th Division, six days later, drove north to take Spigno, Mount Civita, Itri, Fondi, and Roccagorga, reached Anzio, 29 May, and pursued the enemy into Rome, being the first unit of the Fifth Army into the city on 4 June, two days before the Normandy landings, after a stiff engagement on the outskirts of the city. An element of the 88th is credited with being first to enter the Eternal City. After continuing across the Tiber to Bassanelio the 88th retired for rest and training, 11 June. The division went into defensive positions near Pomerance on 5 July, and launched an attack toward Volterra on the 8th, taking the town the next day. Laiatico fell on the 11th, Villamagna on the 13th, and the Arno River was crossed on the 20th although the enemy resisted bitterly.

After a period of rest and training, the 88th Division, now commanded by Major General Paul Wilkins Kendall, opened its assault on the Gothic Line on 21 September, and advanced rapidly along the Firenzuola-Imola road, taking Mount Battaglia (Casola Valsenio, RA) on the 28th. The enemy counterattacked savagely and heavy fighting continued on the line toward the Po Valley. The strategic positions of Mount Grande and Farnetto were taken on 20 and 22 October. From 26 October 1944 to 12 January 1945, the 88th entered a period of defensive patrolling in the Mount Grande-Mount Cerrere sector and the Mount Fano area. From 24 January to 2 March 1945, the division defended the Loiano-Livergnano area and after a brief rest returned to the front. The drive to the Po Valley began on 15 April. Monterumici fell on the 17th after an intense artillery barrage and the Po River was crossed at Revere-Ostiglia on 24-25 April, as the 88th pursued the enemy toward the Alps. The cities of Verona and Vicenza were captured on the 25th and 28th and the Brenta River was crossed on 30 April. The 88th was driving through the Dolomite Alps toward Innsbruck, Austria where it linked up with the 103rd Infantry Division, part of the U.S. Seventh Army, when the hostilities ended on 2 May 1945. The end of World War II in Europe came six days later. Throughout the war the 88th Infantry Division was in combat for 344 days.

Casualties
Total battle casualties: 13,111
Killed in action: 2,298
Wounded in action: 9,225
Missing in action: 941
Prisoner of war: 647

Units

Units assigned to the division during World War II included:

 Headquarters, 88th Infantry Division
 349th Infantry Regiment
 350th Infantry Regiment
 351st Infantry Regiment
 Headquarters and Headquarters Battery, 88th Infantry Division Artillery 
 337th Field Artillery Battalion
 338th Field Artillery Battalion
 339th Field Artillery Battalion
 913th Field Artillery Battalion
 313th Engineer Combat Battalion
 313th Medical Battalion
 88th Cavalry Reconnaissance Troop (Mechanized)
 Headquarters, Special Troops, 88th Infantry Division
 788th Ordnance Light Maintenance Company
 88th Quartermaster Company
 88th Signal Company
 Military Police Platoon
 Band
 88th Counterintelligence Corps Detachment

Post war
After the war, the 88th Infantry Division absorbed some personnel and units from the 34th Infantry Division and served on occupation duty in Italy guarding the Morgan Line from positions in Italy and Trieste until 15 September 1947 when the Italian peace treaty came into force. The 351st Infantry was relieved from assignment to the division on 1 May 1947 and served as temporary military Government of the Free Territory of Trieste, securing the new independent State between Italy and Yugoslavia on behalf of the United Nations Security Council. Designated TRUST (Trieste United States Troops), the command served as the front line in the Cold War from 1947 to 1954, including confrontations with Yugoslavian forces. 
In October 1954 the mission ended upon the signing of the Memorandum of Understanding of London establishing a temporary civil administration in the Anglo-American Zone of the Free Territory of Trieste, entrusted to the responsibility of the Italian Government. 
TRUST units, which included a number of 88th divisional support units, all bore a unit patch which was the coat of arms of the Free Territory of Trieste superimposed over the divisional quatrefoil, over which was a blue scroll containing the designation "TRUST" in white.

Cold War and beyond
The 88th Army Reserve Command (ARCOM) was formed at Fort Snelling in January, 1968, as one of 18 ARCOMs which were organized to provide command and control to Army Reserve units. The initial area of responsibility for the 88th ARCOM included Minnesota and Iowa, and this area was later expanded to include Wisconsin. (Note: ARCOMs were authorized to use the number and shoulder sleeve insignia of infantry divisions with the same number; however, ARCOMs did not inherit the lineage and honors of the divisions because it is against DA policy for a TDA unit, such as an ARCOM, to perpetuate the lineage and honors of a TO&E unit, such as a division.)

In 1996, when the Army Reserve's command structure was revised, the 88th Regional Support Command (88th RSC) was established at Fort Snelling. Its mission was to provide command and control for Reserve units in a six state region, which included Minnesota, Wisconsin, Illinois, Indiana, Michigan and Ohio. In addition, the 88th RSC ensured operational readiness, provided area support services, and supported emergency operations in its area of responsibility.

In 2003, the Army Reserve's command structure was again revised, and the 88th Regional Readiness Command (88th RRC) was formed at Fort Snelling with responsibility for USAR units in the same six states included in the 88th RSC. Various Combat Support units mobilize and deploy to Operation Iraqi Freedom in late 2003-mid 2004.

In its 2005 BRAC Recommendations, DoD recommended to realign Fort Snelling, MN by disestablishing the 88th Regional Readiness Command. This recommendation was part of a larger recommendation to re-engineer and streamline the Command and Control structure of the Army Reserve that would create the Northwest Regional Readiness Command at Fort McCoy, WI.

In 2008, the 88th Regional Readiness Command (88th RRC) moved to Ft McCoy Wisconsin.  The mission was changed to provide base operations support to the new 19 state region, Welcome Home Warrior ceremonies, and the Yellow Ribbon weekends.  The units assigned to the 88th RSC include 6 Army Reserve Bands and the Headquarters Company. It may supervise the 643rd Area Support Group at Whitehall, Ohio.

Current

The division shoulder patch is worn by the United States Army Reserve 88th Readiness Division at Fort Snelling, Minnesota; the division lineage is perpetuated by the 88th RD.  RDs such as the 88th have the same number as inactivated divisions and are allowed to wear the shoulder patch, and division lineage and honors are inherited by an RD.

General
Shoulder patch: A blue (for Infantry) quatrefoil, formed by two Arabic numeral "8s". A rocker above it with the nickname "Blue Devils" was often worn.
During World War II, the Germans thought the 88th was an elite stormtrooper Division. This was most likely due to parallels between the "Blue Devil" nickname and patch rocker and the German SS's use of the Totenkopf death's head insignia.

See also
1st Lieutenant James Henry Taylor
Sgt Keith Matthew Maupin

References

Bibliography
 The Army Almanac: A Book of Facts Concerning the Army of the United States U.S. Government Printing Office, 1950 reproduced at http://www.history.army.mil/html/forcestruc/cbtchron/cbtchron.html. (public domain, work of U.S. government)
 About Face: The Odyssey of an American Warrior, by David Hackworth: pp 35, 308.
 Brown, John Sloan. Draftee Division: the 88th Infantry Division in World War II. Lexington, KY: University Press of Kentucky, 1986. 
 Delaney, John P. The Blue Devils in Italy:  a history of the 88th Infantry Division in World War II. Washington: Infantry Journal Press, [1947]    1988 reprint is also available.

External links

 History of the 88th Division in the Great War
 The 88th Division in the World War of 1914 – 1918
 We Were There: From Gruber to the Brenner Pass
 The battle of Cornuda, the 88th division's last battle of World War II
 Oral history interview with Nicholas Cipu, a Staff Sergeant in the 88th Infantry Division, during World War II from the Veterans History Project at Central Connecticut State University
 752nd Tank Battalion in World War II

088th Infantry Division, U.S.
Infantry Division, U.S. 088th
Military units and formations established in 1917
Military units and formations disestablished in 1947
United States Army divisions of World War I
Infantry divisions of the United States Army in World War II